Posen is an unincorporated community in Bolo Township, Washington County, Illinois, United States. Since 1901, Our Lady of Perpetual Help Church, a member of the Diocese of Belleville has been located here.

References

Unincorporated communities in Washington County, Illinois
Unincorporated communities in Illinois